Whitehall Armory is a historic National Guard armory building located at Whitehall in Washington County, New York. It is a brick and stone castle-like structure built in 1899, designed to be reminiscent of medieval military structures in Europe. It was designed by State Architect Isaac G. Perry. It consists of a 2-story, hip-roofed administration building with an attached gable-roofed drill shed.  The administration building features a 5-story octagonal tower and a -story round tower.

It was listed on the National Register of Historic Places in 1995.

See also
National Register of Historic Places listings in Washington County, New York

References

Armories on the National Register of Historic Places in New York (state)
Government buildings completed in 1899
Infrastructure completed in 1899
Buildings and structures in Washington County, New York
1899 establishments in New York (state)
National Register of Historic Places in Washington County, New York